The Orr Roadside Parking Area is a roadside park on U.S. Route 53 in Orr, Minnesota, United States.  It was built from 1935 to 1938 as a New Deal project to provide motorists with recreational access to Pelican Lake.  It was designed by landscape architect Arthur R. Nichols and constructed by the Civilian Conservation Corps in collaboration with the Minnesota Department of Highways.  The overlook was listed on the National Register of Historic Places in 2002 for its state-level significance in the themes of landscape architecture and politics/government.  It was nominated for exemplifying the early highway waysides built in Minnesota with federal work relief aid, and for exemplifying National Park Service rustic style and the work of Nichols.

See also
 National Register of Historic Places listings in St. Louis County, Minnesota

References

1938 establishments in Minnesota
Buildings and structures completed in 1938
Buildings and structures in St. Louis County, Minnesota
Civilian Conservation Corps in Minnesota
National Register of Historic Places in St. Louis County, Minnesota
Parks on the National Register of Historic Places in Minnesota
Roadside parks
Rustic architecture in Minnesota
Arthur R. Nichols works
Scenic viewpoints in the United States
U.S. Route 53